The Cenotaph also known as Penang War Memorial, is a cenotaph located at the Esplanade in George Town, Penang, Malaysia. The site of the Cenopath is situated at the shoreline of the Esplanade, at Jalan Tun Syed Sheh Barakbah (at a section of street also known as The Esplanade) and Jalan Padang Kota Lama (Esplanade Road), by the padang (open field) and the City Hall that it fronts.

The present Cenotaph is a 1948 reconstruction of the original built in 1929.

Description 
Designed by Swan & Maclaren and constructed at the cost of $12,000, the original Cenotaph was intended to commemorate Allied servicemen from Penang who lost their lives in The Great War. The Cenotaph was fashioned as a scaled-down semblance to the Whitehall Cenotaph in London, constructed out of granite blocks and adorned with bronze plaques. The unveiling of the Cenotaph took place during the 1929 Remembrance Day, with Edward, Prince of Wales, in attendance.

During the Japanese occupation of Malaya in World War II, the Cenotaph was destroyed during Allied bombings of Penang in 1944 and 1945. Following the end of the war, a team of architects led by Charles Geoffrey Boutcher helped to reconstruct the Cenotaph using remaining fragments of the first Cenotaph at a cost of $3,500, resulting in slight deviations from its original design. The rebuilt Cenotaph was unveiled during the 1948 Remembrance Day, and remains as a site for annual Remembrance Day ceremonies.

In addition to the cenotaph proper, the site also hosts a smaller memorial plaque erected by the Penang Veterans Association, commemorating the war dead in World War II (including prisoners of war who worked at the Thailand–Burma Railway), the Malayan Emergency, the subsequent re-insurgency, and the Indonesia–Malaysia confrontation.

References

Monuments and memorials in Malaysia
Buildings and structures in George Town, Penang
Landmarks in Penang
Tourist attractions in George Town, Penang
World War I memorials